John Cumberland was an actor on stage and screen. He had starring roles and featured in comedies.

According to IMDb he was born in Saint John, New Brunswick, Canada, in 1857.

In 1919 he starred in the Pathé film The Gay Old Dog directed by Hobart Henley.

He co-starred in Mrs. Sidney Drew's After Thirty comedy film series and starred in her 1919 film The Gay Old Dog.

Theater
Twin Beds (1914 play) (1914)
Fair and Warmer (1915)
Parlor, Bedroom and Bath (1917)
Double Exposure (1918)
Up in Mabel's Room (play) (1919)
The Girl in the Limousine (play) (1919)
Ladies' Night (1920)
Pickwick (1927)

Filmography

Baby Mine (1917 film), as Jimmie
The Gay Old Dog (1919), as Jimmy Dodd
A Sisterly Scheme (1919)
The Unconventional Maida Greenwood (1920), a short, as Maida's Husband
The Stimulating Mrs. Barton (1920), a short 
The Emotional Miss Vaughn (1920), a short 
The Charming Mrs. Chase (1920), a short

Gallery

References

1857 births
Year of death missing